Sir Michael Cavenagh Gillett KBE CMG (12 July 1907 – 20 January 1971) was a British diplomat.

Education
Gillett was educated at the Royal Naval College, Osborne and Royal Navy College, Dartmouth and then at Manchester University.

Career in China
Gillett was appointed a student interpreter in the British China Consular Service in January 1929 and served as Vice-Consul in Canton (now Guangzhou), Hankow, Nanking and Kashgar.  He was promoted to the rank of Consul in 1937 and was Acting Consul General in Kashgar from June 1938 and Acting Consul at Tengyueh (now Tengchong) from 1940 to 1942. He served as Chinese Secretary to the Legation in Chunking (now Chongqing) in 1942 and then transferred back to Kashgar in that year.  He was appointed deputy consul general in Shanghai in 1947 and then Consul General in 1948 serving to November that year. He served in China until 1953.

Later career
Gillett served as British Consul General in Los Angeles between 1954 and 1957 and then as British Ambassador to Afghanistan from 1957 to 1963. He retired in 1963.

Awards
He was awarded a CMG in 1951 and was knighted in 1962.

References

External links

Royal Asiatic Society catalogue for Gillett's papers

1907 births
1971 deaths
Alumni of the University of Manchester
Ambassadors of the United Kingdom to Afghanistan
Knights Commander of the Order of the British Empire
Companions of the Order of St Michael and St George
Graduates of Britannia Royal Naval College
People educated at the Royal Naval College, Osborne